John Selwyn (c. 1709–1751) was an English politician.

He was a Member of Parliament (MP) for Whitchurch from 1734 to 27 June 1751.

References

1709 births
1751 deaths
British MPs 1734–1741
British MPs 1741–1747
British MPs 1747–1754
Members of the Parliament of Great Britain for English constituencies